Great Brington is a village in Northamptonshire, England, in the civil parish of Brington, which at the 2011 Census had a population of about 200. St Mary the Virgin's church is the parish church.

The villages name means 'Farm/settlement connected with Bryni'.

In 1508, John Spencer from Wormleighton in Warwickshire purchased the estate of Althorp outside Great Brington with its moated house and several hundred acres of farmland. He had grazed sheep here from the 1480s. In 1508, impressed by the quality of the land, he eventually bought it and rebuilt the house. In 1511 he made further purchases to acquire much of the surrounding countryside, including the villages of Little Brington and Great Brington as well their parish church of St Mary the Virgin, from Thomas Grey, 2nd Marquess of Dorset.

Just outside the village is Althorp House, the home of the Spencer family and Diana, Princess of Wales. Several members of the Spencer family are buried at  Great Brington church, including Diana's father the 8th Earl Spencer, who died in 1992. The death of Diana had an effect on the village – the pub was renamed from The Fox and Hounds to the Althorp Coaching Inn and the post office gained currency exchange facilities following the large increase in tourism to the area.

The Macmillan Way long distance footpath passes through Great Brington.

Geography

Nearby settlements include Little Brington, Nobottle and Long Buckby

Notable people from Great Brington
 Lawrence Washington (1602–1653), the great-great-grandfather of George Washington, first president of the United States, is buried in the chancel of the Church at St Mary's in the village. (reference link needs updating as it is also suggested that he rests at All Saints Church, Maldon, Essex)
 Betsy Baker (1842–1955), a supercentenarian who was born in Great Brington and recognized as the world's oldest living person until she died at the age of 113 on 24 October 1955.
 The disc jockey and television presenter Jo Whiley is from the village.

References

External links

BBC feature on Great Brington church
Great Brington Parish Church website
Great Brington Store and Post Office website

Villages in Northamptonshire
Burial sites of the Spencer-Churchill family
West Northamptonshire District